Gohardasht, is a neighborhood of Karaj, in Alborz Province of Iran, located on the north side of Karaj.

It is known for the Gohardasht Prison.

Karaj
Neighbourhoods in Iran